The following list of freshwater fish species and subspecies known to occur in the U.S. state of Oregon is primarily taken from "Inland Fishes of Washington" by Richard S. Wydoski and Richard R. Whitney (2003), but some species and subspecies have been added from the Oregon Department of Fish and Wildlife (ODFW) website.  Some scientific names have been updated or corrected. Asterisks denote introduced fishes. 108 species and subspecies are listed, 33 of them introduced. The list includes several anadromous species, and seven normally marine species–starry flounder, staghorn sculpin, saddleback gunnel, Pacific herring, topsmelt, surf smelt, and shiner perch–that are occasionally found in fresh water.

Petromyzontiformes

Family Petromyzontidae
Pacific lamprey, Entosphenus tridentatus
River lamprey, Lampetra  ayresi
Pit-Klamath brook lamprey, Lampetra lethophaga
Western brook lamprey, Lampetra  richardsoni

Acipenseriformes

Family Acipenseridae
Green sturgeon, Acipenser medirostris
White sturgeon, Acipenser transmontanus

Atheriniformes

Family Atherinidae
Topsmelt, Atherinops affinis

Clupeiformes

Family Clupeidae
American shad*, Dorosoma sapidissima
Pacific herring, Clupea pallasi

Cypriniformes

Family Catostomidae
Bridgelip sucker, Catostomus columbianus
Largescale sucker, Catostomus macrocheilus
Sacramento sucker, Catostomus occidentalis
Mountain sucker, Catostomus platyrhynchus
Klamath smallscale sucker, Catostomus rimiculus
Klamath largescale sucker, Catostomus snyderi
Tahoe sucker, Catostomus tahoensis
Warner sucker, Catostomus warneri
Shortnose sucker, Chasmistes brevirostris
Lost River sucker, Deltistes luxatus

Family Cobitidae
Weatherfish*, Misgurnus anguillicaudatus

Family Cyprinidae
Chiselmouth, Acrocheilus alutaceus
Goldfish*, Carassius auratus
Lake chub, Couseius plumbeus
Grass carp*, Ctenopharyngodon idella
Common carp*, Cyprinus carpio
Tui chub, Gila bicolor
Hutton Springs tui chub, Gila bicolor ssp.
Borax Lake chub, Gila boraxobius
Blue chub, Gila coerulea
California roach, Hesperoleucus symmetricus
Peamouth, Mylocheilus caurinus
Oregon chub, Oregonichthys crameri
Umpqua chub, Oregonichthys kalawatseti
Northern pikeminnow, Ptychocheilus oregonensis
Umpqua pikeminnow, Ptychocheilus umpquae
Longnose dace, Rhinichthys cataractae
Umpqua dace, Rhinichthys evermanni
Leopard dace, Rhinichthys falcatus
Umatilla dace, Rhinichthys umatilla
Speckled dace, Rhinichthys osculus
Foskett specked dace, Rhinichthys osculus ssp.
Redside shiner, Richardsonius balteatus
Lahontan redside shiner, Richardsonius egregius
Golden shiner*, Notemigonus crysoleucas

Cyprinodontiformes

Family Fundulidae
Banded killifish*, Fundulus diaphanus
Rainwater killifish*, Lucania parva

Family Poeciliidae
Mosquitofish*, Gambusia affinis

Perciformes

Family Centrarchidae
Sacramento perch*, Archoplites interruptus
Green sunfish*, Lepomis cyanellus
Bluegill*, Lepomis macrochirus
Pumpkinseed*, Lepomis gibbosus
Warmouth*, Lepomis gulosus
Redear sunfish*, Lepomis microlophus
Smallmouth bass*, Micropterus dolomieui
Largemouth bass*, Micropterus salmoides
White crappie*, Pomoxis annularis
Black crappie*, Pomoxis nigromaculatus

Family Embiotocidae
Shiner perch, Cymatogaster aggregata

Family Percidae
Yellow perch*, Perca flavescens
Walleye*, Sander vitreus

Family Moronidae
Striped bass*, Morone saxatilis

Family Pholidae
Saddleback gunnel, Pholis ornata

Percopsiformes

Family Percopsidae
Sand roller, Percopsis transmontanus

Gadiformes

Family Gadidae
Burbot, Lota lota

Gasterosteiformes

Family Gasterosteidae
Three-spine stickleback, Gasterosteus aculeatus

Osmeriformes

Family Osmeridae
Surf smelt, Hypomesus pretiosus
Longfin smelt, Spirinchus thaleichthys
Eulachon, Thaleichthys pacificus

Pleuronectiformes

Family Pleuronectidae
Starry flounder, Planichthys stellatus

Salmoniformes

Family Salmonidae
Chinook salmon, Oncorhynchus tshawytscha
Coho salmon, Oncorhynchus kisutch
Chum salmon, Oncorhynchus keta
Sockeye salmon/Kokanee, Oncorhynchus nerka
Pink salmon, Oncorhynchus gorbuscha
Golden trout*, Oncorhynchus mykiss aguabonita
Rainbow trout Oncorhynchus mykiss
 Coastal rainbow trout, O. m. irideus (includes anadromous steelhead)
 Columbia River redband trout, O. m. gairdneri (includes anadromous steelhead)
 Great Basin redband trout, O. m. newberri
Cutthroat trout, Oncorhynchus clarki
Coastal cutthroat trout, Oncorhynchus clarki clarki
Westslope cutthroat trout, Oncorhynchus clarki lewisi
Lahontan cutthroat trout, Oncorhynchus clarki henshawi
Mountain whitefish, Prosopium williamsoni
Atlantic salmon*, Salmo salar
Brown trout*, Salmo trutta
Bull trout, Salvelinus confluentus
Brook trout*, Salvelinus fontinalis
Lake trout*, Salvelinus namaycush
Arctic grayling*, Thymallus arcticus

Scorpaeniformes

Family Cottidae
Coastrange sculpin, Cottus aleuticus
Prickly sculpin, Cottus asper
Mottled sculpin, Cottus bairdi
Paiute sculpin, Cottus beldingi
Shorthead sculpin, Cottus confusus
Riffle sculpin, Cottus gulosus
Marbled sculpin, Cottus klamathensis
Margined sculpin, Cottus marginatus
Reticulate sculpin, Cottus perplexus
Pit sculpin, Cottus pitensis
Klamath Lake sculpin, Cottus princeps
Torrent sculpin, Cottus rhotheus
Slender sculpin, Cottus tenius
Pacific staghorn sculpin, Leptocottus armatus

Siluriformes

Family Ictaluridae
Black bullhead*, Ameiurus melas
Yellow bullhead*, Ameiurus natalis
Brown bullhead*, Ameiurus nebulosus
White catfish*, Ictalurus catus
Blue catfish*, Ictalurus furcatus
Channel catfish*, Ictalurus punctatus
Tadpole madtom*, Noturus gyrinus
Flathead catfish*, Pylodictis olivaris

References

External links
 FishBase
 Integrated Taxonomic Information System
 Oregon Threatened, Endangered and Candidate Species
 ODFW Interim risk assessment on Foskett speckled dace
ODFW Interim risk assessment on Hutton Springs tui chub
ODFW Interim risk assessment on Borax lake chub
ODFW Sensitive species web pages

Fish
Oregon
.Oregon
.Oregon